The Prince of Wales Mountains are a mountain range running along the central-east coast of Ellesmere Island, Nunavut, Canada. The range is one of the most northern ranges in the world and of the Arctic Cordillera, which is a vast deeply dissected mountain range from Ellesmere Island to the northernmost tip of Labrador. The Prince of Wales Icefield lies mostly in the range.

See also
List of mountain ranges

Mountain ranges of Qikiqtaaluk Region
Arctic Cordillera